Massimiliano Ossari (29 April 1977 – 22 April 2002) was an Italian professional footballer who plays defender.

Career
Ossari played for the youth club of Calcio Padova. He made his debut in Serie A on 23 December 1995 in the last twenty minutes of the Piacenza-Padova over 1-1. He took the field in the match against Napoli finished 4-2 for biancoscudati. His career mostly alternated between Serie C1 and Serie C2 with the Novara, Giorgione, Cremonese (with which marks his only goal), Poggesi and Thiene.

On 1 July 1995 Ossari played for the National Under-18 team. Italy-Slovenia finished 4-0.

On 22 April 2002 he died in a car accident.

Honours
Padova
Serie C2 (1): 2000–01

External links
 Profile at Legaserieb.it 
 Profile at Figc.it 
 

1977 births
2002 deaths
Italian footballers
Calcio Padova players
Serie A players
Serie B players
Association football defenders
Road incident deaths in Italy